Hans Prytz (born 5 May 1963) is a Swedish football manager and former player. With the exception of the last year, he spent his entire playing career at Örgryte IS, where he also won the Swedish championship in 1985. After retiring, he spent years working as a manager for lower league clubs and then moved on to coaching women's football with IK Zenith and Jitex BK. In November 2011 he took over as manager for his former club Örgryte, which had slipped into the third tier of Swedish football. The next season, he helped them win promotion back into Superettan.

References

1963 births
Living people
Örgryte IS players
Swedish footballers
Swedish football managers
Assyriska FF managers
Örgryte IS managers
Association footballers not categorized by position